The men's hammer throw event at the 2017 European Athletics U23 Championships was held in Bydgoszcz, Poland, at Zdzisław Krzyszkowiak Stadium on 13 and 14 July.

Medalists

Results

Qualification
13 July

Qualification rule: 67.50 (Q) or the 12 best results (q) qualified for the final.

Final
14 July

References

Hammer throw
Hammer throw at the European Athletics U23 Championships